Acrylonitrile is an organic compound with the formula  and the structure .  It is a colorless, volatile liquid although commercial samples can be yellow due to impurities.  It has a pungent odor of garlic or onions.  In terms of its molecular structure, it consists of a vinyl group linked to a nitrile.  It is an important monomer for the manufacture of useful plastics such as polyacrylonitrile.  It is reactive and toxic at low doses. Acrylonitrile was first synthesized by the French chemist Charles Moureu (1863–1929) in 1893.

Occurrence 
Acrylonitrile is not naturally formed on Earth. It has been detected at the sub-ppm level at industrial sites. It persists in the air for up to a week.  It decomposes by reacting with oxygen and hydroxyl radical to form formyl cyanide and formaldehyde.
Acrylonitrile is harmful to aquatic life.

Acrylonitrile has been detected in the atmosphere of Titan, a moon of Saturn. Computer simulations suggest that on Titan conditions exist such that the compound could form structures similar to cell membranes and vesicles on Earth, called azotosomes.

Production
Acrylonitrile is produced by catalytic ammoxidation of propylene, also known as the SOHIO process. In 2002, world production capacity was estimated at 5 million tonnes per year, rising to about 6 million tonnes by 2017. Acetonitrile and hydrogen cyanide are significant byproducts that are recovered for sale. In fact, the 2008–2009 acetonitrile shortage was caused by a decrease in demand for acrylonitrile.
2 CH3-CH=CH2 + 2 NH3 + 3 O2 -> 2 CH2=CH-C#N + 6 H2O

In the SOHIO process, propylene, ammonia, and air (oxidizer) are passed through a fluidized bed reactor containing the catalyst at 400–510 °C and 50–200 kPag. The reactants pass through the reactor only once, before being quenched in aqueous sulfuric acid. Excess propylene, carbon monoxide, carbon dioxide, and dinitrogen that do not dissolve are vented directly to the atmosphere, or are incinerated. The aqueous solution consists of acrylonitrile, acetonitrile, hydrocyanic acid, and ammonium sulfate (from excess ammonia). A recovery column removes bulk water, and acrylonitrile and acetonitrile are separated by distillation. Historically, one of the first successful catalysts was bismuth phosphomolybdate supported on silica as a heterogeneous catalyst. Further improvements have since been made.

Alternative routes
Various green chemistry routes to acrylonitrile are being explored from renewable feedstocks, such as lignocellulosic biomass, glycerol (from biodiesel production), or glutamic acid (which can itself be produced from renewable feedstocks). The lignocellulosic route involves fermentation of the biomass to propionic acid and 3-hydroxypropionic acid, which are then converted to acrylonitrile by dehydration and ammoxidation. The glycerol route begins with its dehydration to acrolein, which undergoes ammoxidation to give acrylonitrile. The glutamic acid route employs oxidative decarboxylation to 3-cyanopropanoic acid, followed by a decarbonylation-elimination to acrylonitrile. Of these, the glycerol route is broadly considered to be the most viable, although none of these green methods are commercially competitive.

Uses
Acrylonitrile is used principally as a monomer to prepare polyacrylonitrile, a homopolymer, or several important copolymers, such as styrene-acrylonitrile (SAN), acrylonitrile butadiene styrene (ABS), acrylonitrile styrene acrylate (ASA), and other synthetic rubbers such as acrylonitrile butadiene (NBR). Hydrodimerization of acrylonitrile affords adiponitrile, used in the synthesis of certain nylons:
2 CH2=CHCN  +  2 e-  + 2 H+  -> NC-CH2-CH2-CH2-CH2-CN
Acrylonitrile is also a precursor in the industrial manufacture of acrylamide and acrylic acid.

Synthesis of specialty chemicals
The reaction of acrylonitrile with protic nucleophiles is a common route to a variety of specialty chemicals.  The process is called cyanoethylation:
YH + H2C=CH-CN -> Y-CH2-CH2-CN
Typical protic nucleophiles are alcohols, thiols, and especially amines. 

Acrylonitrile and derivatives, such as 2-chloroacrylonitrile, are dienophiles in Diels–Alder reactions.

Health effects
Acrylonitrile is highly flammable and toxic at low doses. It undergoes explosive polymerization. The burning material releases fumes of hydrogen cyanide and oxides of nitrogen.  It is classified as a Class 2B carcinogen (possibly carcinogenic) by the International Agency for Research on Cancer (IARC), and workers exposed to high levels of airborne acrylonitrile are diagnosed more frequently with lung cancer than the rest of the population. Acrylonitrile is one of seven toxicants in cigarette smoke that are most associated with respiratory tract carcinogenesis.  The mechanism of action of acrylonitrile appears to involve oxidative stress and oxidative DNA damage.  Acrylonitrile increases cancer in high dose tests in male and female rats and mice and induces apoptosis in human umbilical cord mesenchymal stem cells.

It evaporates quickly at room temperature (20 °C) to reach dangerous concentrations; skin irritation, respiratory irritation, and eye irritation are the immediate effects of this exposure. Pathways of exposure for humans include emissions, auto exhaust, and cigarette smoke that can expose the human subject directly if they inhale or smoke. Routes of exposure include inhalation, oral, and to a certain extent dermal uptake (tested with volunteer humans and in rat studies). Repeated exposure causes skin sensitization and may cause central nervous system and liver damage.

There are two main excretion processes of acrylonitrile. The primary method is excretion in urine when acrylonitrile is metabolized by being directly conjugated to glutathione. The other method is when acrylonitrile is enzymatically converted into 2-cyanoethylene oxide which will produce cyanide end products that ultimately form thiocyanate, which is excreted via urine. Exposure can thus be detected via blood draws and urine sampling.

References

External links
National Pollutant Inventory – Acrylonitrile
Comparing Possible Cancer Hazards from Human Exposures to Rodent Carcinogens
Acrylonitrile – Integrated Risk Information System, U.S. Environmental Protection Agency
CDC – NIOSH Pocket Guide to Chemical Hazards – Acrylonitrile
OSHA Table Z-1 for Air Contaminants

Vinyl compounds
Fumigants
Hazardous air pollutants
IARC Group 2B carcinogens
Monomers

Commodity chemicals
Nitriles